James L. Edwards (born November 26, 1972) is an American actor, screenwriter, and filmmaker from Akron, Ohio. He is best known for his acting roles in independent shot on video horror films from the 90's including Bloodletting, Polymorph, and The Dead Next Door as well as writing, directing, and starring in Her Name Was Christa, Brimstone Incorporated, and the forthcoming Trivial.

Biography 
Edwards began acting as a teenager making his debut in 1989's The Dead Next Door and proceeding to star in a string of independent shot on video horror films throughout the 90's including Ozone, Polymorph, and Bloodletting. After a hiatus, he returned to acting in the mid 2000's and in 2020 made his directorial debut with Her Name Was Christa which he also wrote and starred in along with Brimstone Incorporated and the upcoming Trivial. In 2021, he directed and starred in the music video for the song Stitch from the band Sponge. Edwards co-stars in the David Ellefson produced and Drew Fortier directed found footage horror film Dwellers portraying a fictionalized version of himself.

Filmography

Actor

Director

Writer

References

External links 

 

Male actors from Akron, Ohio
1972 births
Living people
American male film actors